"Song of Pig" is a freely downloadable song by Xiang Xiang (香香), who quickly became a popular Internet pop star in China.  According to one of its hosted sites, it has been downloaded a billion times (see BBC article: "Chinese pop idol thrives online") throughout China, Singapore and Malaysia.  The song's lyrics describe a pig. An MP3 file of the track was placed on 163888.net.  It is the title track of Xiang Xiang's first solo album.

References
BBC article: "Chinese pop idol thrives online"
"Song of Pig" music video on YouTube
"Song of Pig" free mp3 download
Blog mentioning the song
YesAsia.com product site for the song's album

Xiang Xiang (singer) songs
Chinese songs
Fictional pigs